Pirzadeh is a surname. Notable people with the surname include:

 Mojtaba Pirzadeh (born 1986), Iranian actor
 Rasoul Pirzadeh (born 1982), Iranian footballer
 Zinat Pirzadeh (born 1967), Iranian-Swedish female comedian

See also
 Pirzadeh, village in Iran